L. ehrenbergii may refer to:

 Lemboglossum ehrenbergii, a flowering plant
 Linckia ehrenbergii, a sea star
 Lobelia ehrenbergii, a flowering plant
 Lutjanus ehrenbergii, a perciform fish